Jarosty  is a village in the administrative district of Gmina Moszczenica, within Piotrków County, Łódź Voivodeship, in central Poland.

The village has a population of 460.

References

Jarosty